Daniel Clos Álvarez (born 23 October 1988) is a Spanish former professional racecar driver. In 2012, He was the test driver for the now defunct HRT Formula One team.

Career

Karting
Born in Barcelona, Clos was a fairly successful karter at the ICA Junior level of karting, winning firstly the Catalan district of the Spanish ICA Junior Championship in 2001, beating a field including the brother of former Formula Three Euroseries rival Daniel Campos-Hull, Oliver. Success continued in 2002, when Dani won the Copa Campeones Trophy and finished 10th in the Italian Open Masters, against a top-quality field of drivers including Nico Hülkenberg, Sébastien Buemi, Nelson Panciatici, Oliver Oakes and Buemi's cousin Natacha Gachnang amongst others.

2003 was by far and away his best year of karting, winning both the prestigious Andrea Margutti Trophy equipped with an MGM Racing Birel beating Miguel Molina and Jules Bianchi to the flag, and the Spanish ICA Junior Championship, along with placings of 6th in the Italian Open Masters and 11th in the European Championship. 2004 saw a move up to Formula A, but he decided to dovetail it with a campaign in the Formula Junior 1600 series in Spain. He would finish 36th in the Formula A European Championship, with a solitary point. He called time on his karting career after a 30th place in the 2005 Margutti Trophy.

Formula Junior 1600 Spain
Clos made the move into single-seaters in 2004, with a campaign in the Formula Junior 1600 championship. Clos adapted to the cars very well, and ended up a solid 4th place in the championship behind Michael Herck, Marco Barba and Arturo Llobell, with one win and four podiums along the way.

Formula Renault 2.0
After just one season racing at 1600cc Formula Renault level, Dani moved up to the two litre cars, with a drive in both the Eurocup Formula Renault 2.0 for Pons Racing, and the Italian Formula Renault Championship for Facondini Racing. Clos struggled in the pan-European championship, failing to record a finish inside the top ten placings all season. His best finish came during the 11th round of the championship, at Donington Park when he recorded an 11th-place finish. He was slightly more successful in the Italian series despite missing three races due to Eurocup commitments, finishing sixteenth in the championship with 28 points beating teammate Oliver Campos-Hull in the process. His best finishes were a pair of sevenths, coming at Imola in round three, and also at Spa during round six. Clos would return to both series for a second season in 2006.

Clos moved to Jenzer Motorsport for both campaigns in 2006, hoping to give him a little more success than what he had for his previous two teams in 2005. His European campaign landed him in seventh place overall in a tightly-contested championship. He won three races, second only to champion Filipe Albuquerque's tally of four, and these wins came in succession – doing the double at Istanbul Park and winning the first race at Misano. He had originally done the double at Misano, which would have taken his tally to four in succession, however he was disqualified due to his car's diffuser height not complying with Eurocup regulations. This handed Chris van der Drift his first victory of the 2006 season.

In the Italian championship, Clos got off to a steady start with a second and two third places in the first six races which at the time of the Spa round in early June, Clos was already some way behind championship leader Adrian Zaugg, who had won five of the first six races, and had finished third in the race that he didn't win. However, the rest of the season belonged to Clos. He won eight of the last nine races to overhaul Zaugg and win the championship by 36 points in the end. He recorded four double victories at Spa, Hockenheim, Misano and Monza and finished second in the single-race meeting at Varano.

Formula Three Euroseries
After his title win, Dani moved up to the Formula Three Euroseries for the 2007 season, signing up to drive for Signature-Plus. Clos had a solid, yet unspectacular first season with a championship position of 13th, with thirteen points. His best result was a fourth place during the reverse-grid round sixteen in Barcelona – the race now infamous with one of the biggest startline crashes in Euroseries history, in which nine cars were eliminated. He also finished fifteenth during the Masters of Formula 3 event at Zolder, finishing some four seconds behind the eventual Euroseries champion Romain Grosjean and some 42 seconds behind winner Hülkenberg.

Clos returned to the series for a second season in 2008, this time moving to Prema Powerteam. However, he ended up one place lower than what he was in 2007, finishing 14th with a total of 16.5 points. He only recorded six points-scoring finishes during the season, two of which were podium finishes coming at Pau (3rd) and 2nd in the rain-shortened race at Le Mans. He would have finished level on points with Jon Lancaster on 19 points had he been awarded 5 points rather than 2.5 at Le Mans. He also recorded a fastest lap in round 2 at Hockenheim, and started round 4 at Mugello from pole, thanks to the reverse-grid system.

Formula Renault 3.5 Series
Clos made his debut in Formula Renault 3.5 Series at Le Mans for Epsilon Euskadi, replacing Adrián Vallés, who was busy driving the Liverpool F.C. car in Superleague Formula at Zolder. In his first race, he moved from 20th on the grid, to finish tenth and pick up a championship point. He also picked up the bonus point for progressing the most spots during the race, with ten. He continued in the series at the Autódromo Internacional do Algarve, picking up a point for qualifying third in his group. A ninth-place finish was his best result of the weekend, which also included an incident with teammate Chris van der Drift. He was replaced by Keisuke Kunimoto for the final two rounds.

GP2 Series

Having tested for both GP2 Series teams and ones in the Formula Renault 3.5 Series, Clos was signed by the Racing Engineering team for the 2009 GP2 Series on 8 February 2009. He scored his first points and podium in the final race at the Autódromo Internacional do Algarve, ending up 21st overall. In the off-season, he contested two rounds of the GP2 Asia Series for Trident Racing. He continued with Racing Engineering into the 2010 season. Clos became a regular podium contender in 2010, scoring points in every round and had one retirement at the Monaco sprint race. He won his maiden GP2 race at the Turkish sprint round, and as of the Hungaroring race occupied third in the championship. At the Belgian round of the championship, he suffered a compressed vertebra in a collision at the start of the feature race, and did not take part in the sprint race. Clos has remained with Racing Engineering for the 2011 season; his teammates thus far have been Christian Vietoris and Álvaro Parente. The team also competed in the GP2 Asia Series for the first time, in which Clos, partnered with Nathanaël Berthon, scored a race win at Imola to finish ninth in the championship. In the main series, he finished ninth in the championship with a best finish of two second places.

Clos began the 2012 season without a drive, but was drafted into the Barwa Addax team after the first round of the championship, replacing Josef Král and alongside Johnny Cecotto. After four races in the seat, Král returned to take it back over.

In November 2014, it was announced Clos would be racing with Arden International alongside Tio Ellinas for the 2015 season.

Formula One
Clos has been employed on a few occasions as a test driver for the Williams F1 team, the first of these came in September 2008, when he participated in a day's testing at Jerez in Spain. He tested again in December 2008 at the same circuit, for another day's testing.

Clos also took part in the Abu Dhabi young drivers' test on 15 November 2011 at the Yas Marina Circuit. He drove 68 laps in the HRT F1 Team's F111 and ended the day 12th with a fastest time of 1’45.329.

On 13 February 2012, he was announced as the HRT F1 Team's test driver for the 2012 season. He made his race weekend début at the Spanish Grand Prix and again took part at the British, German and Hungarian Grands Prix, driving Narain Karthikeyan's car during the first free practice session on these occasions.

Racing record

Complete Formula 3 Euro Series results
(key)

Complete GP2 Series results
(key) (Races in bold indicate pole position) (Races in italics indicate fastest lap)

Complete GP2 Asia Series results
(key) (Races in bold indicate pole position) (Races in italics indicate fastest lap)

Complete GP2 Final results
(key) (Races in bold indicate pole position) (Races in italics indicate fastest lap)

Complete Formula Renault 3.5 Series results
(key) (Races in bold indicate pole position) (Races in italics indicate fastest lap)

Complete Formula One participations
(key) (Races in bold indicate pole position) (Races in italics indicates fastest lap)

Complete European Le Mans Series results
(key) (Races in bold indicate pole position; results in italics indicate fastest lap)

References

External links
 Official website
 Career statistics, from Driver Database
 

Living people
1988 births
GP2 Series drivers
Spanish racing drivers
Racing drivers from Barcelona
Formula 3 Euro Series drivers
Formula Renault Eurocup drivers
Italian Formula Renault 2.0 drivers
GP2 Asia Series drivers
World Series Formula V8 3.5 drivers
Signature Team drivers
Prema Powerteam drivers
Racing Engineering drivers
Epsilon Euskadi drivers
Trident Racing drivers
Rapax Team drivers
Campos Racing drivers
MP Motorsport drivers
Pons Racing drivers
Jenzer Motorsport drivers